The Dueling Dinosaurs or Montana Dueling Dinosaurs is a fossil specimen originating from the Hell Creek Formation of Montana. It consists of the fossilized skeletons of an adolescent Tyrannosaurus rex and a Triceratops horridus entangled with one another, and entombed in sandstone. The "dueling" inference comes from the numerous injuries sustained by both dinosaurs, including a tooth from the Tyrannosaurus embedded within the Triceratops, although it is not known whether they were actually buried fighting one another. Despite the scientific importance of the specimen, it has remained relatively obscure due to a lengthy legal dispute over property rights to the specimen, which has since been resolved. The fossil is currently in the possession of the North Carolina Museum of Natural Sciences.

History 
The specimen was originally discovered in 2006 by ranchers Clayton Phipps, Mark Eatman, and Chad O’Connor in Montana. Two different ranching families, the Seversons and the Murrays, owned the land on which the fossils were found. After the fossils and the surrounding rock were excavated, the ranchers unsuccessfully tried to sell the fossil to several museums throughout the decade, including the Smithsonian and the Museum of the Rockies. The ranchers then attempted to sell the specimen to a private buyer, including auctioning at Bonhams, but also to no avail.

In 2016, Lindsay Zanno of the North Carolina Museum of Natural Sciences reached out to Phipps, starting negotiations to purchase the fossil, with funds being raised through the private nonprofit Friends of the North Carolina Museum of Natural Sciences. However, legal issues over rightful ownership of the fossils slowed these negotiations; the Seversons had most of the control over mineral rights on Murray land, and if whether fossils could be considered minerals (in which case the Seversons would have rights to it) was disputed. Although a previous court had ruled in favor of the Murrays, in November 2018 judges ruled in favor of the Seversons and that fossils could legally be considered minerals in Montana, angering many paleontologists. However, the case was appealed to the Montana Supreme Court in 2020, who ruled that fossils could not be considered minerals, allowing for the Museum of Natural Sciences to acquire the fossils.

Significance 
The specimen is considered one of the best-preserved and most complete fossils of both species (as well as the most complete Tyrannosaurus specimen ever found at over 98% completeness), and contains skin impressions, and potentially internal organs, stomach contents, and proteins.

See also 

 Fighting Dinosaurs, another fossil specimen preserving a theropod fighting a ceratopsian, in this case Velociraptor and Protoceratops.

References 

Tyrannosaurus
Cretaceous fossil record
Paleontology in Montana
Hell Creek Formation
Dinosaur fossils
Tourist attractions in Raleigh, North Carolina
2006 in paleontology